Carlos Matheus Silva Santos (born May 1, 1984 in Aracaju) is a Brazilian mathematician working in dynamical systems, analysis and geometry. He currently works at the CNRS, in Paris.

He earned his Ph.D. from the Instituto de Matemática Pura e Aplicada (IMPA) in 2004 under the supervision of Marcelo Viana, at the age of 19.

Selected publications 
with G. Forni, and A. Zorich: "Square-tiled cyclic covers", Journal of Modern Dynamics, vol. 5, no. 2,  pp. 285–318 (2011).
with A. Avila, and  J.-C. Yoccoz: "SL(2,R)-invariant probability measures on the moduli spaces of translation surfaces are regular", Geometric and Functional Analysis, vol. 23, no. 6, pp. 1705–1729 (2013).
with M. Möller, and J.-C. Yoccoz: "A criterion for the simplicity of the Lyapunov spectrum of square-tiled surfaces", ''Inventiones mathematicae (2014).

Further reading 
Época – Os segredos das ilhas de excelência (by Carlos Rydlewski, in Portuguese)

References

External links 
 Matheus' home-page at the IMPA
 Matheus' personal blog "Disquisitiones Mathematicae"

Brazilian mathematicians
1984 births
Living people
People from Aracaju
Dynamical systems theorists
Mathematical analysts
Geometers
Instituto Nacional de Matemática Pura e Aplicada alumni
Brazilian expatriate academics